Luis Villafañe (born June 21, 1981 in San Juan, Puerto Rico) is a Puerto Rican professional basketball player who plays with Caciques de Humacao of the Puerto Rican Baloncesto Superior Nacional.  He also is a member of the Puerto Rico National Basketball Team.

He made his debut for the senior Puerto Rican team at the 2008 Centrobasket tournament and was also selected to represent the nation in the FIBA Americas Championship 2009.

At the club level, he began his career with Cangrejeros de Santurce in 1999, and won four titles with them before moving to Grises de Humacao in 2006.

His signature skill is setting picks & protecting the paint.  He is the best in Puerto Rico at it, that is why he is always among the first selections of the Puerto Rico men's national basketball team. He also 
continues to improve his offensive game.

References

External links
 Basquetplus profile
 Latinbasket.com profile
 RealGM profile

1981 births
Living people
Baloncesto Superior Nacional players
Basketball players at the 2011 Pan American Games
Basketball players at the 2015 Pan American Games
Caciques de Humacao players
Central American and Caribbean Games gold medalists for Puerto Rico
Competitors at the 2006 Central American and Caribbean Games
Gigantes de Carolina players
Indios de Mayagüez basketball players
Niagara Purple Eagles men's basketball players
Pan American Games gold medalists for Puerto Rico
Pan American Games medalists in basketball
Piratas de Quebradillas players
Potros ITSON de Obregón players
Puerto Rican expatriate basketball people in Mexico
Puerto Rican expatriate basketball people in Uruguay
Puerto Rican men's basketball players
Puerto Rico men's national basketball team players
Sportspeople from San Juan, Puerto Rico
Central American and Caribbean Games medalists in basketball
Medalists at the 2011 Pan American Games